Roberto Zenit is a Mexican scientist currently at the Brown University School of Engineering. Zenit previously worked at the National Autonomous University of Mexico and is an Elected Fellow of the American Physical Society. His field of expertise is Fluid Mechanics, including Two-Phase Flows, Non-Newtonian Fluids, the Fluid Mechanics of Painting, and Biological Flows. Recent work has also focused on studying the behaviour of Bubbly Drinks.

References

Year of birth missing (living people)
Living people
Fellows of the American Physical Society
21st-century Mexican physicists
California Institute of Technology alumni
National Autonomous University of Mexico alumni

Brown University faculty